The Governor of South Chungcheong Province is the head of the local government of South Chungcheong Province who is elected to a four-year term.

List of governors

Appointed governors (before 1995) 
From 1945 to 1995, the Governor of South Chungcheong Province was appointed by the President of the Republic of Korea.

Directly elected governors (1995–present) 
Since 1995, under provisions of the revised Local Government Act, the Governor of South Chungcheong Province is elected by direct election.

Elections 
Source:

1995

1998

2002

2006

2010

2014

2018

2022

See also 
Government of South Korea
Politics of South Korea

References 

South Chungcheong Province
Lists of political office-holders in South Korea